Mordheim: City of the Damned is a tactical role-playing game video game developed by Rogue Factor, a branch of Cyanide, for Microsoft Windows and published by Focus Home Interactive on November 19, 2015. The game is based on Games Workshop's 1999 tabletop game Mordheim.

Gameplay
Mordheim: City of the Damned is based on the Mordheim tabletop game, which is a skirmish-oriented derivative of the larger Warhammer Fantasy wargames. Accordingly, the video game puts the player in control of a small warband that fights rival teams over resources around the titular city of Mordheim. At the start of the game, the player chooses a faction (Sisters of Sigmar, Mercenaries from the Empire, Skaven, or the Cult of the Possessed in the base game) and over the course of the game, is given to opportunity to improve their warband's strength by recruiting, leveling, improving and customizing a roster of combatants as well as their equipment. Losing battles can lead to permanent injuries or even death of the members of the player's warband, so the emphasis is on careful engagements and survival. In addition to a single-player campaign, players can pit their warbands against other players online.

Release
Mordheim was released on Steam Early Access in November 2014, prior to its full release. The game was later ported to Xbox One and PlayStation 4, for which it was released on 18 October 2016.

Two expansions were later released, each adding a new faction: the Witch Hunters in June 2016 and the Undead in October. These expansions were also released as a part of the "Complete DLC Pack".

Reception

The game received mixed reviews, gaining an average score of 74/100 on Metacritic. Some reviewers praised the "pleasantly morbid" atmosphere and deep game mechanics as befitting the tabletop original, but the game AI, steep and unforgiving learning curve, and technical issues (particularly user interface and load times) were described as frustrating.

Rock, Paper, Shotgun was particularly critical of the "uninspiring",  "unexciting" and "languid" combat, calling the game "dumb" and "flawed".

References

External links

2015 video games
Focus Entertainment games
Early access video games
Games Workshop games
Multiplayer and single-player video games
PlayStation 4 games
Turn-based strategy video games
Video games developed in Canada
Video games using procedural generation
Warhammer Fantasy video games
Windows games
Xbox One games